Heinrich-Schmidt-Barrien-Preis is a literary prize of Germany awarded for the preservation of Low German.

German literary awards